Memory House is a 2020 drama film directed by João Paulo Miranda Maria. The film was part of the selection of the 2020 Toronto International Film Festival.

The film was named as an Official Selection of the 2020 Cannes Film Festival, although it was not able to screen at Cannes due to the cancellation of the festival in light of the COVID-19 pandemic in France.

The film won the Roger Ebert Award at the 2020 Chicago International Film Festival.

References

External links 
 

2020 films
2020 drama films
2020s Portuguese-language films
2020s German-language films
Brazilian drama films
French drama films
2020 multilingual films
Brazilian multilingual films
French multilingual films
2020s French films